"Azymes" (plural of azyme) is an archaic English word for the Jewish matzah, derived from the Ancient Greek word ἄζυμος (ἄρτος) ázymos (ártos), "unleavened (bread)", for unfermented bread in Biblical times; the more accepted term in modern English is simply unleavened bread or matzah, but cognates of the Greek term are still used in many Romance languages (Spanish pan ácimo, French pain azyme, Italian azzimo, Portuguese pão ázimo and Romanian azimă). The term does not appear frequently in modern Bible translations, but was the usual word for unleavened bread in the early Catholic English Douay–Rheims Bible.

The adjectival form "azymite" was used as a term of abuse by Byzantine Rite Christians against Roman Rite Christians. The Eastern Orthodox Church has continued the ancient Eastern practice of using leavened bread for the Lamb (Host) in the Eucharist. After serious theological disputes between Rome and the churches of the East, Latin use of unleavened bread, azymes, for the Eucharist—a point of liturgical difference—became also a point of theological difference between the two, and was one of several disputes which led eventually to the Great Schism between Eastern and Western Christianity in 1054.

See Also

 Nshkhar

References

Septuagint words and phrases
Archaic English words and phrases
East–West Schism
Eucharist
Matzo